The Young Unionists, formally known as the Ulster Young Unionist Council (UYUC), is the youth wing of the Ulster Unionist Party (UUP). It has in its present incarnation been in existence since 2004.

History

Attempts had been made in the 1920s to create a youth movement linked to that of the Conservative Party (the Junior Imperial and Constitutional League) without much success.  A second attempt was made before the outbreak of the Second World War, which also failed.  The UYUC was formed by the Standing Committee of the Ulster Unionist Council in 1946 and quickly became a successful movement in South & West Belfast, Fermanagh and Down. The body's first Chairman was future Prime Minister of Northern Ireland, Brian Faulkner

In 1959, Brian Maginess, Q.C., and Sir Clarence Graham, Bt., spoke to the Young Unionists advocating an increase in Roman Catholic membership of the UUP.  This was regarded as controversial at the time.

The body created many prominent figures in Northern Ireland politics throughout the 1960s and 1970s such as Bill Craig and John D. Taylor; however, disagreements over Government policy and other factors left the body in disarray by the early 1970s, and it disbanded following the collapse of the Stormont Parliament.  The body re-emerged under the Chairmanship of David McNarry and continued to thrive throughout the 1980s, producing figures such as Edgar Graham, Jeffrey Donaldson, Peter Weir and Arlene Foster with the latter 3 defecting to the DUP.

1990s to present
The body's membership was strongly opposed to the Belfast Agreement in 1998, and many campaigned against it. At the 2004 AGM the officers voted to disband the group.

A new organisation was reconstituted later that year and has since enjoyed a period of sustained growth. The UYUC has branches at Queen's University, Belfast, the University of Ulster and branches at constituency level in the City of Belfast, Mid-Ulster/West Tyrone, Lagan Valley and also Newry and Armagh/South Down, as well as Fermanagh & South Tyrone.

The youth wing has produced many current and former senior faces in the party including The Lord Laird, The Lord Rogan, Jeffrey Donaldson MP MLA and David McNarry, all of whom are former Chairmen, as well as Lord Empey, who served as Vice Chairman.

Current activities

In recent years the Young Unionists have continued to function as an active political youth wing. In the 2014 local government elections 11 members of the Young Unionists were returned as councillors. This represents over 10% of the UUP's total councillors.

The Young Unionists host a number of events on an annual basis including a summer debate series and conference.

2022 Officers

Chairman: Mr. Ben Sharkey
Hon. Secretary: Miss Kellie Cowan
Hon. Treasurer: Mr. Nathan Redmond
Senior Vice-Chairman: Cllr. Matthew Bell
Vice-Chairman (International): Miss Olivia Swan
Public Relations Officer: Miss Alana Cahoon
Events Organiser: Mr. Adam Aicken
Membership Secretary: Mr. Josh Lowry
Universities Officer: Mr. Jay Buntin

Chairpersons

Second UYUC
1998 & 1999: Peter King
2002 & 2003: Cllr. Peter Brown

Current UYUC
2004: Mr. Kenny Donaldson
2005: Cllr. Peter Bowles
2006 & 2007: Cllr. Mark Dunn
2008: Mr. Peter Munce (January 2008 - October 2008)
2008 & 2009: Mr. Michael Shilliday
2010 & 2011: Mr. Alasdair O'Hara
2012 & 2013: Mr. Frank Geddis
2014: Cllr. Alexander Redpath
2015: Ms. Cathy Corbett
2016 & 2017: Cllr. Alexander Redpath
2018 & 2019: Mr. Joshua Lowry
2020 & 2021: Cllr. Stuart Hughes
2022 : Mr. Ben Sharkey

References

Sources
'The Ulster Unionist Party, 1882–1973 : its development and organisation' (1973), J F Harbinson
'A history of the Ulster Unionist Party : protest, pragmatism and pessimism' (2004) Graham Walker
'The Ulster Unionist Party 1972–92 (A Political Movement in an Era of Conflict and Change)' (1996), Dr David Hume

External links
Website

Youth wings of political parties in Ireland
Youth wings of political parties in Northern Ireland
Ulster Unionist Party
Youth wings of Alliance of Conservatives and Reformists in Europe member parties